Sir Harold Leslie Boyce, 1st Baronet KBE, KStJ (9 July 1895 – 30 May 1955) was an Australian-born British Conservative Party politician.

Boyce was born in Taree, New South Wales, the son of Charles Macleay Boyce, a solicitor, and his wife Ethel May (née) Thorne. He was educated at The Sydney Church of England Grammar School (Shore), Sydney Grammar School and Balliol College, Oxford, and was later called to the Bar, Inner Temple. He served during the First World War in the Australian Imperial Force as a second lieutenant in the 27th Battalion, and later as a lieutenant in the 10th Battalion. In July 1916, he was wounded at Pozières and invalided back to Adelaide.

After the war he eventually settled in Cheltenham, Gloucestershire and in 1931 became Chairman of the Gloucester Railway Carriage and Wagon Company. In 1929 he was elected to the House of Commons as Member of Parliament (MP) for Gloucester, a seat he held until 1945. Boyce was also high sheriff of Gloucestershire from 1941 to 1942 and Sheriff of the City of London from 1947 to 1948 and served as Lord Mayor of London between 1951 and 1952. Boyce was appointed a Knight Commander of the Order of the Bath (KBE) in the 1944 Birthday Honours. On 24 November 1952 he was created a baronet, of Badgeworth in the County of Gloucester.

Boyce was also the President of Gloucester City Football Club from 1937 to 1949.

Boyce married Maybery Browse Bevan, daughter of Edwin Philip Bevan, in 1926. They had three sons; Richard, Charles and John. He died in May 1955, aged 59, and was succeeded in the baronetcy by his eldest son Richard. The baronetcy is currently held by Richard's son, Robert Boyce.

Lady Mayberry Boyce died in 1978.

Notes

References
Kidd, Charles, Williamson, David (editors). Debrett's Peerage and Baronetage (1990 edition). New York: St Martin's Press, 1990, 

Biography

External links 
 

|-

|-

1895 births
1955 deaths
People from Taree
Baronets in the Baronetage of the United Kingdom
Knights of Justice of the Order of St John
Knights Commander of the Order of the British Empire
Alumni of Balliol College, Oxford
Australian Army officers
Australian military personnel of World War I
Australian emigrants to the United Kingdom
Sheriffs of the City of London
20th-century lord mayors of London
20th-century English politicians
Conservative Party (UK) MPs for English constituencies
UK MPs 1929–1931
UK MPs 1931–1935
UK MPs 1935–1945
Members of Parliament for Gloucester
High Sheriffs of Gloucestershire